

450001–450100 

|-bgcolor=#f2f2f2
| colspan=4 align=center | 
|}

450101–450200 

|-bgcolor=#f2f2f2
| colspan=4 align=center | 
|}

450201–450300 

|-bgcolor=#f2f2f2
| colspan=4 align=center | 
|}

450301–450400 

|-id=390
| 450390 Pitchcomment ||  || Pitch Comment (born 1970) is a press artist and cartoonist in the Swiss Jura. He lives in the medieval and educational town of Porrentruy, workplace of the discoverer Michel Ory. || 
|}

450401–450500 

|-bgcolor=#f2f2f2
| colspan=4 align=center | 
|}

450501–450600 

|-bgcolor=#f2f2f2
| colspan=4 align=center | 
|}

450601–450700 

|-bgcolor=#f2f2f2
| colspan=4 align=center | 
|}

450701–450800 

|-bgcolor=#f2f2f2
| colspan=4 align=center | 
|}

450801–450900 

|-bgcolor=#f2f2f2
| colspan=4 align=center | 
|}

450901–451000 

|-id=931
| 450931 Coculescu ||  ||  (1866–1952), a Romanian astronomer, founder and first director of the Bucharest Astronomical Observatory, Romania || 
|}

References 

450001-451000